Acinodrillia amazimba is a species of sea snail, a marine gastropod mollusk in the family Drilliidae.

Description
The length of the brown, biconic-claviform shell varies between 8.8 mm and 9.5 mm; its width is 3.7 mm. The spiral sculpture of the shell shows sharply incised grooves, carving through the fine, raised axial ribs into small nodules.

Distribution
This marine species occurs off West Transkei, South Africa.

References

External links
 Biolib: Acinodrillia amazimba

Endemic fauna of South Africa
amazimba
Gastropods described in 1988